Mofebutazone (or monophenylbutazone) is a drug used for joint and muscular pain. It is a 3,5-pyrazolinedione derivative.

The drug binds to plasma albumin and competes with drugs such as coumarin anticoagulants, indomethacin and glucocorticoids.

References 

Nonsteroidal anti-inflammatory drugs
Pyrazolidindiones